Rehoboth (Reḥovot; lit. broad places) is the name of three biblical places:

 "A well in Gerar dug by Isaac, supposed to be in Wady er-Ruheibeh, about 20 miles south of Beersheba." Isaac gave it the name Rehoboth, which means "open spaces". Isaac's servants had dug two wells and the herdsmen of Gerar quarrelled because of these two wells with Isaac's herdsmens. So when they dug the third well and there were no quarrels Isaac named it Rehoboth saying "Now the Lord has given us room and we will flourish in the land."
 An ancient city from which came Saul, an Edomite king, "Rehoboth by the river". Since "the River" in the Bible generally is used about Euphrates, scholars have suggested either of two sites near the junction of the Khabur River and the Euphrates. However, this would be a place far outside the Edomite territory. The river mentioned could be a river in the land of Edom, such as Wadi Zered (also known as Wadi al-Hasa). Rehoboth could possibly be identical with a site southeast of the Dead Sea.
 Rehoboth-Ir was a biblical town named in Genesis  as among those founded by Nimrod. Its exact geographic location is unknown. Rehoboth-Ir may possibly have been in the vicinity of the town of Nineveh. However, its name is identical to the Hebrew phrase "rehovot ir, meaning "streets of the town" or "public square of the town", which may refer to Nineveh itself, rather than the name of a distinct town.

Nabatean and Byzantine town in the Negev

This was a thriving city in Byzantine times. In Israel today it is called "Rehovot ba-Negev" (Rehovot-in-the-Negev). It was apparently founded in the first century AD by the Nabateans. It grew to more than 10,000 people by the fifth century, thanks to its being on the Incense Route.

See also
 Nimrud#Archaeology
 Rehoboth (disambiguation)
 Rehovot—modern Israel city close to Tel Aviv, named after Gen. 26:22

References

Hebrew Bible cities